Narayani Temple is dedicated to ten armed goddess Narayani or Parvathi and is located in Narayani village situated near Khalikote, Odisha, India. The temple is popular for Durga Puja and a fair held in the Indian month of Chaitra. The temple was renovated by the zamindars of Khalikote in the early 18th century. The style of the temple is a Khakhara Deula, like Vaital Deula. It is supposed to have existed before 12th Century AD. The temple is known for the scenic beauty of the surrounding countryside' including Chilika Lake.

Location
Lat. 20°14’35" N., Long. 85°50’06"E., Elev. 75 ft 
Narayani temple is situated within the precinct of Bhabani Sankara temple which is located on the left side of the Tala Bazar road leading from Lingaraja temple to Bindusagar. It is 15.00 metres east of Sari deul, 20.00 metres north-east of Suka temple, 5.00 metres Northeast of Arjuneswara temple and behind the
Bhabani Sankar temple. The temple was
totally buried and was partly exposed by an excavation conducted by Debala Mitra.

Age 
Precise date :
7th Century A.D.

Approximate date: Bhauma epoch.

Source of Information :
Pabhaga three mouldings, rectangular jagamohana with
features of Parasurameswara of 7th century A.D. It was first noticed by Charles Fabri and
partly exposed by D. Mitra. Now only a part of the eastern wall and southern wall is visible
beneath a Sanskrit College under the name Krushna Chandra Gurukula Vidyapitha.

Property Type 

Precinct/ Building/ Structure/Landscape/Site/Tank: Precinct. 
Subtype: Temple.

Property use 
i) Abandoned/ in use: Abandoned.

ii) Present use: Non living

iii) Past use: Worshipped.

Physical description

Surrounding 
The temple is buried below the Sanskrit College behind
the Bhabani Sankar Temple.

Orientation 
Facing towards North.
308

Architectural features (Plan and Elevation) 
The visible parts of the temple measure
6.75 metres in length and 4.35 metres in width. The bada
that is visible has threefold division namely pabhaga
with three mouldings (0.85 metres), Jangha (1.55 metres)
and baranda (0.33 metres).

Raha niche & parsva devatas 
In the
western wall of the vimana, raha niche is visible that
measures 0.80 metres in height, 0.85 metres width and 0.20
metres in depth. It houses a panel of Uma-mahesvara.

Decorative features 
The khura is inscribed in
south wall decorated with four decorated vertical
pilasters with chaitya medallions as similar with south
wall bada of the Vaital temple.
The eastern wall is decorated with two vertical pilasters
on either sides of raha niche. Within the pilaster there
is a subsidiary niche with scroll works measures 0.35
metres height x 0.22 metres width and 0.05 metres in depth
decorated with elephant and lion heads surmounted
by lotus design. The niche crowned with a vajramundi
at the center of which a peeping human face. Above
the niche there is a stylised chaitya. The baranda portion decorated with muktalobhi hansa
flanked by two stylised chaitya. The jagamohana is a rectangular hall in shape decorated
with three baluster windows, one measures 1.20 metres in height and 1.00 metres in width except
this the jagamohana is devoid of
ornamentation.
The jambs of niche is decorated with three
vertical bands of scroll works like lotus leaf,
beaded design and floral motif from exterior
to interior flanked by two vertical pilasters.
At the base and top of the pilaster decorated
with ghata pallava with scroll design.
The temple is totally buried from three sides
only eastern side excarnated which is visible
originally temple has doorjambs but at
present it was buried.

Building material 
Sandstone.

Construction techniques 
Dry masonry

Style 
Kalingan

State of preservation 
Good/Fair/ Showing Signs of Deterioration/Advanced:  The temple is totally buried.
Traces of the bada are only visible. Superstructure has collapsed.

Condition description 
Signs of distress: 
The temple is broken from the bada

Grade (A/B/C) 
i) Architecture: A

ii) Historic: A

iii) Associational: A

iv) Social/Cultural: A

Threats to the property 
Conservation Problem and Remedies: The temple is covered with wild vegetation
which is furthering the process of deterioration.

References

External links
 reports on Narayani
 images of Narayani Temple
 Lesser Known Monuments of Bhubaneswar by Dr. Sadasiba Pradhan
 http://www.aparnatravels.com/chilika-narayani.htm
 http://ignca.nic.in/asp/showbig.asp?projid=orkhr1320001
 https://web.archive.org/web/20110628181730/http://ignca.nic.in/img_0002_as_or_khurda.htm
 http://www.temples.ind.in/temples/temples-in.../hindu-temples-of-orissa.htm
 List of Hindu temples in India#Orissa

Hindu temples in Ganjam district
Parvati temples